Chris Cross (born Christopher Thomas Allen, 14 July 1952, Tottenham, London) is an English musician, best known as the bass guitarist in the new wave band Ultravox.

Biography

Early years 
Cross went to Belmont Secondary Modern School, William Forster Comprehensive. He began his music career playing in different bands, in Tottenham, North London, with his major early influences being Small Faces, Desmond Dekker, The Crazy World of Arthur Brown.

Later he joined Stoned Rose, in Preston, Lancashire, alongside Pete Hughes and Mick Carroll, who later went to form Ritzi, but also decided to go to college to study psychology, a longstanding interest.

Tiger Lily and Ultravox 
In 1973, he returned to London to go to Art College and began studying Art and Psychology. Meanwhile, he also answered the ad for members to form a new band, put by in Dennis Leigh, an art student in London, thus forming Tiger Lily along with guitarist Stevie Shears, drummer Warren Cann joined shortly and violinist/keyboardist Billy Currie added the next year.

Tiger Lily spent a year constructing/arranging and rehearsing their songs written mostly by Leigh in Modrenos, a mannequin refurb workshop in Kings Cross, London. After playing gigs from 1974 to 1976, in the latter year the band chose to call themselves Ultravox! and signed to Island Records.

In 1979, after three commercially unsuccessful but influential albums – Ultravox! (1977), Ha!-Ha!-Ha! (1977) and Systems of Romance (1978) – and a tour through USA and Canada, original vocalist John Foxx and guitarist Robin Simon, who had replaced Stevie Shears a year before, left Ultravox, so Cross worked on another part-time "Purely for Fun" project with Pretenders' guitarist James Honeyman-Scott, one of his favourite guitar players, Eddie and the Hot Rods' vocalist Barrie Masters and The Rods drummer Steve Nicol.

With Midge Ure added to Ultravox, the band continued working more on their unique synthesiser sounds during the recording of their successful Vienna album. By that time, he and Ure were close friends, together directing music videos such as Bananarama's "Shy Boy" and "The Telephone Always Rings" by Fun Boy Three. Cross took part in the Band Aid video and wrote the music to "The Bloodied Sword". After another few successful albums – Rage in Eden (1981), Quartet (1982), Monument (1983) and Lament (1984) – and the last which was less successful, U-Vox, and a tour in 1987, the band drifted into other projects and he says, "never got round to working on Ultravox".

Ultravox revival 
In November 2008, it was announced that Ultravox were to embark on the "Return To Eden" tour in April 2009, plus two festivals and additionally a Best of Ultravox CD/DVD was released by EMI.

The 2012 album release, Brilliant, included Chris Allen as co-writer with Billy Currie and Midge Ure on all tracks. The album was promoted with a UK theatre tour and a series of European dates.

Equipment 
During the time in which Ultravox was led by John Foxx, he used a Guild B-301, a white Gibson EB-3 and fretless Fender Precision basses, and an EMS Synthi AKS and later Mini Moog synthesisers with an Ampeg amplifier with  speaker cabinets.

While the recording of Vienna album, he used a Yamaha bass, a Fender Precision bass, a Mini Moog synthesiser and Yamaha synthesiser

Later he also used Status and Steinberger basses.

Cross's distinctive grey bass is an Ibanez RoadStar from the early 1980s; this bass has been used on many of Ultravox's albums and was Cross' primary instrument during the first stage of the 'Return to Eden' Tour in 2009.

On the 'Return to Eden' tour in 2010 and the 'Brilliant' tour in 2012, he also used a Rickenbacker 4003 Fireglo finish bass and a standby black Fender Telecaster Bass.

References 

1952 births
Living people
English rock bass guitarists
English new wave musicians
People from Tottenham
Musicians from London
Ultravox members
Glam rock musicians
British synth-pop new wave musicians